Shaidu (شيدو) is a town in the Nowshera District of the Khyber Pakhtunkhwa, Pakistan. The population is approximately 75,000. Shaidu lies on the alluvial silt of the Indus river. It is a centre of the surrounding agricultural lands. Shaidu lies on the Grand Trunk Road at a strategic point. It has fallen to various ruling forces through recorded history. Shaidu is the village of Khattak tribe, and it lies on Grand Trunk Highway N-5 from Jehangira to Adamzai Village and Chashmai to Mian Essa.

Location

Shaidu township is located in the northern part of Pakistan. It lies approximately 100 km northwest of the capital Islamabad. The nearest town, Nowshera lies approximately 24 km to the west. Further away, approximately 50 km to the west is Peshawar city. Beyond Peshawar is the border with Afghanistan. To the north is the city of Mardan. To the east is the Indus river and to the south are the Khattak mountains. Shaidu lies near the south bank of the River Kabul (لندي سيند) before it joins the Indus. The PeshawarRawalpindi Road (N5), once the Grand Trunk Road and the railway pass through Shaidu.

History

Harappan civilization

Shaidu lies within the Indus valley where men have lived since 3000 BCE. Shaidu lies approximately 500 km northwest of the archeological site at Harappa, where finds indicate a flourishing Indus valley civilization lasting from 2600 BCE to 1900 BCE. Theories as to the end of the Harappan civilisation include drought, invasion, epidemic illness and comet impact. After the decline of the Harappan civilisation, communities became smaller and more rural. However, the area of the Khyber Pakhtunkhwa became a centre for trade, culture, language and a route for eastward migration especially of the Indo-Aryan peoples.

Alexander the Great
In the autumn of 327 BCE, the forces of Alexander the Great (356 BCE  323 BCE) reached Pushkalavati (near Charsadda), approximately 60 km northwest of Shaidu. After the death of Alexander, the area about Shaidu came under the influence of several kingdoms including the Maurya Empire (322 BCE  180 BCE), and the Greco-Bactrian Kingdom (256 BCE  125 BCE).

Introduction of Buddhism
The Buddhist based Kushan Empire (30 CE  375 CE) made Purushapura (now Peshawar) one of their capitals.

Introduction of Hinduism
As the Kushan empire fractured and declined, the Indus Valley became a suzerainty of the Gupta Empire (319 CE  605 CE) which brought Hinduism and relative peace to the valley. This peace in the northern Indus Valley, including Shaidu, was broken by an invasion of White Huns who were repelled in 455 CE. One of the feudal dynasties of the Peshawar district of the 6th century and on were the Shahiya.

Introduction of Islam

In 1001 CE, the Shahiya ruler, Jaipala, was defeated at the Battle of Peshawar by Mahmud of Ghazni (971  1030 CE). Mahmud of Ghanzi, a member of the Ghaznavid dynasty, brought Islam to the region.

A succession of Islamic leaders held the Indus Valley from the 1st to 8th centuries CE. Between 1173 and 1186, Muhammad of Ghor invaded and took power in Peshawar and Lahore. The population was forced to convert to Islam. His rule lasted till his assassination in 1206. Following rulers included the Lodi (1451  1526) and the Mughal (1526  1857). In the 17th century, local traditional tribesmen, such as the khattaks, rebelled against the foreign ruling forces.

Battle of Shaidu
In the early 18th century, as the Mughal Empire declined, a new empire, the Durrani Empire was formed in the Indus valley from a union of territories. However, in the late 18th century and early 19th century, a number of battles between the Durranis and Afghan Pashtun tribes ensued. In 1815, Sikhs under Ranjit Singh (1780  1839) took Peshawar and its surrounds.

Syed Ahmad (1786  1831) was a radical Sunni Islamist from northern India. After rallying followers, militia, funds and the credibility from two trips to Mecca, Syed Ahmad went to the Peshawar valley as Imam, intending to make the valley a base from which to destroy the Sikh Empire and defend against the British Raj.

In 1827, Syed Ahmad met with the leaders of the Durranis, two brothers named Yar Muhammad Khan and Pir Muhammad Khan. The Durranis initially pled allegiance to Syed Ahmed. Legend holds that on the evening of 24 February 1827, the brothers turned and had the cook poison Syed Ahmad and the Durranis thence forth refused to fight.

On 25 February 1827, Syed Ahmad's forces and the mujahidin moved towards Shaidu where the forces of the Sikh leader, Budh Singh were encamped. On the battle field, the Sikh forces prevailed but Syed Ahmad escaped. The battle field may have been at what is now the Shaidu old cemetery.

British rule
By the mid 19th century, the Sikh empire was in decline. On 29 March 1849, the British East India Company militia took control of the Peshawar valley with an army of overwhelming force. The British left on 14 August 1947 at Partition leaving Shaidu in the Islamic Republic of Pakistan.

Geography

Shaidu's elevation above sea level is 276 m. Shaidu lies on the gravel and silt alluvial plain of the Indus River with at least 300 m of rock below. The area is prone to catastrophic flooding from the Indus River and earthquakes related to the movement of the Asian and Indian tectonic plates.

Shaidu's river water source relies on meltwater from the glaciers of the Hindu Kush, Hindu Raj and Himalayas. Agriculture depends on irrigation from streams as rainfall is inconsistent. In the late 19th century, the British created a new irrigation system beside those of ancient days.

Shaidu's climate is semi-arid to sub-humid, subtropical continental. The average annual rainfall is 550 mm per annum.
The Peshawar valley has summer average maximum temperatures occurring in June, rising to 40 degrees Celsius. The minimum winter average temperatures occur in January, falling to 6 degrees Celsius. Rainy days are infrequent and unpredictable, occurring one to six days per month.

Agriculture

Crops
Shaidu is a centre for local farmers. Subsistence farming provides food for families. Land ownership is up to 4 acres per farmer. Crops for sale include maize, barley, wheat, corn millet, and cotton, rape seed, sugar cane, sugar beet, okra, fruits and vegetables such as tomatoes, potatoes and onions, legumes, and tobacco. 
Irrigation is from canals, tube wells and rainfall. Irrigation canals may carry waste water or fresh water. The waste water carries a risk of heavy metals contamination with zinc and manganese. Water for crops is moderately saline. In Charsadda, approximately 50 km from Shaidu, a crop of opium poppies was found and destroyed. Acacia is grown for firewood.

Livestock

Shaidu is the location of an annual mela. It takes place few days before the Eid al-Adha, a sacrificial feast. People come from far and wide to sell their animals at the mela. On Wednesday, a local market for the sale of goats and sheep happens near Shaidu bus stops. The animals are brought from local villages.

Sport 
Popular sports in Shaidu are cricket, volleyball and football. Two Nowshera District night cricket tournaments.

Gallery
Mela, Shaidu, 7 November 2011.

References

External links
 Shaidu Maplandia.

Populated places in Nowshera District